Carlos Tejedor Partido is a  partido in the north-west of Buenos Aires Province in Argentina.

Settlements
Carlos Tejedor
Colonia Seré
Curarú
Timote
Tres Algarrobos

External links

 

1877 establishments in Argentina
Partidos of Buenos Aires Province